Events from the year 1967 in Taiwan, Republic of China. This year is numbered Minguo 56 according to the official Republic of China calendar.

Incumbents
 President – Chiang Kai-shek
 Vice President – Yen Chia-kan
 Premier – Yen Chia-kan
 Vice Premier – Huang Shao-ku

Events

January
 1 January – The establishment of Cheng Shin Rubber.
 11 January – The establishment of Yunlin Prison in Yunlin County.
13 January – Cross-Strait conflict: Republic of China Air Force Lockheed F-104G Starfighters engage People's Liberation Army Naval Air Force Mikoyan-Gurevich MiG-19s in the final direct confrontation between China and Taiwan.

March
 11 March – The opening of Land Reform Museum in Songshan District, Taipei City.

May
 16 May – The groundbreaking ceremony for the construction of Fo Guang Shan in Dashu Township, Kaohsiung County.

June
 30 June – The establishment of Nan Jeon Junior College of Technology in Yanshuei Township, Tainan County.

July
 1 July
 Taipei was declared special municipality.
 Zhongli was upgraded from an urban township to a county-administered city.

August
 6 August – The opening of Yun Hsien Resort in Wulai Township, Taipei County.

September
 16 September – The establishment of Directorate-General of Personnel Administration.

Births
 22 February – Danny Wen, writer
 11 March – Kuo Kuo-wen, Deputy Minister of Labor (2016–2017)
 29 March – Luo Yijun, writer
 30 April
 Lily Tien, actress
 Phil Chang, singer
 2 May – Kang Kang, singer and television host
 1 July – Sansan Chien, former composer
 6 July – Cheng Wen-tsan, Mayor of Taoyuan City
 19 October – Liao Hsiao-chun, television presenter
 20 December – Hsiao Ya-chuan, film director

References

 
Years of the 20th century in Taiwan